Sardar Mansab Ali Dogar (born 30 March 1959) is a Pakistani politician who had been a member of the National Assembly of Pakistan, from 2008 to May 2018.

Early life
He was born on 30 March 1959.

Political career

He ran for the seat of the Provincial Assembly of the Punjab as a candidate of Pakistan Muslim League (N) (PML-N) from Constituency PP-229 (Pakpattan-III) in 2002 Pakistani general election but was unsuccessful. He received 22,167 votes and lost the seat to Mumtaz Hussain, a candidate of Pakistan Muslim League (Q) (PML-Q).

He was elected to the National Assembly of Pakistan as a candidate of PML-N from Constituency NA-164 (Pakpattan-I) in 2008 Pakistani general election. He received 35,597 votes and defeated Pir Muhammad Shah Khagga, a candidate of PML-Q. In the same election, he was also elected to the Provincial Assembly of the Punjab as a candidate of PML-N from Constituency PP-229 (Pakpattan-III). He received 22,092 voted and defeated Mian Muhammad Amjad Joiya, a candidate of PML-Q. He vacated Punjab Assembly seat and retained National Assembly seat.

He was re-elected to the National Assembly as a candidate of PML-N from Constituency NA-164 (Pakpattan-I) in 2013 Pakistani general election. He received 67,984 votes and defeated Muhammad Shah Khagga, a candidate of PML-Q.

In October 2017, he was made Federal Parliamentary Secretary for Defence.

References

Living people
Pakistan Muslim League (N) politicians
Punjabi people
Pakistani MNAs 2013–2018
1959 births
Pakistani MNAs 2008–2013